The 2016 Chinese Taipei Masters Grand Prix will be the 16th grand prix's badminton tournament of the 2016 BWF Grand Prix Gold and Grand Prix. The tournament will be held at the Hsing Chuang Gymnasium in Taipei City, Chinese Taipei on October 11–16, 2016 and has a total purse of $55,000.

Men's singles

Seeds

  Hsu Jen-hao (semifinals)
  Sameer Verma (second round)
  Kanta Tsuneyama (third round)
  Jacob Maliekal (second round)
  Lin Yu-hsien (semifinals)
  Firman Abdul Kholik (second round)
  Hashiru Shimono (second round)
  Muhammad Bayu Pangisthu (second round)

Finals

Top half

Section 1

Section 2

Section 3

Section 4

Bottom half

Section 5

Section 6

Section 7

Section 8

Women's singles

Seeds

  Pai Yu-po (first round)
  Tee Jing Yi (quarterfinals)
  Ayumi Mine (champion)
  Goh Jin Wei (first round)
  Pornpawee Chochuwong (semifinals)
  Hana Ramadhini (quarterfinals)
  Fitriani (first round)
  Dinar Dyah Ayustine (second round)

Finals

Top half

Section 1

Section 2

Bottom half

Section 3

Section 4

Men's doubles

Seeds

  Chen Hung-ling / Wang Chi-lin (final)
  Or Chin Chung / Tang Chun Man (first round)
  Liao Min-chun / Tseng Min-hao (second round)
  Hardianto / Kenas Adi Haryanto (second round)
  Hiroyuki Saeki / Ryota Taohata (semifinals)
  Lin Chia-yu / Wu Hsiao-lin (first round)
  Lim Khim Wah / Ong Jian Guo (first round)
  Nur Mohd Azriyn Ayub / Jagdish Singh (second round)

Finals

Top half

Section 1

Section 2

Bottom half

Section 3

Section 4

Women's doubles

Seeds

  Yuki Fukushima / Sayaka Hirota (champion)
  Poon Lok Yan / Tse Ying Suet (quarterfinals)
  Chayanit Chaladchalam / Phataimas Muenwong (second round)
  Shiho Tanaka / Koharu Yonemoto (final)

Finals

Top half

Section 1

Section 2

Bottom half

Section 3

Section 4

Mixed doubles

Seeds

  Terry Hee Yong Kai / Tan Wei Han (quarterfinals)
  Liao Min-chun / Chen Hsiao-huan (second round)
  Chang Ko-chi / Chang Hsin-tien (second round)
  Lin Chia-yu / Wu Ti-jung (semifinals)

Finals

Top half

Section 1

Section 2

Bottom half

Section 3

Section 4

References

2016
2016 Chinese
2016 in badminton
2016 in Taiwanese sport
October 2016 sports events in Asia